Days of Memories is a series of dating sims from SNK for cell phones, beginning in 2005. SNK released a compilation of the first three games for the Nintendo DS in 2007, with new graphics and an extra viewing mode.

Summary
The games are dating sims starring SNK and ADK characters that take place in a parallel world to their own. In each game, the player is given the month of July to start a relationship with one of the girls featured in the game, in order to finish the game with the beginnings of a workable relationship.

Games
 
Released on October 17th, 2005.
The cast of this game is considered to be fan favorites from their respective debut games.
Features - Athena Asamiya, Kasumi Todoh, B. Jenet, King, Mai Shiranui, Yuri Sakazaki, Leona Heidern, Kula Diamond.
Male characters - Kyoya Kaido (original)

 
Released on February 1st, 2006.
Debuted the first unique Days Of Memories character.
Features - Hotaru Futaba, Kisarah Westfield, Fiolina "Fio" Germi, Chizuru Kagura, Mature, Blue Mary.
Male characters - Kyo Kusanagi, Iori Yagami
Exclusive character - Shizuku Misawa.

 
Released on May 15th, 2006.
Is set during the era of Feudal Japan.
It is the first game in the series to show where the girls are.
Features - Nakoruru, Mina Majikina, Rinka Yoshino, Saya, Mikoto, Shiki, Iroha.
Male characters - Haohmaru, Genjuro Kibagami, Ukyo Tachibana, Kyouemon (original)
Exclusive characters - Shino, Chiyo.
This game features only Samurai Shodown characters, rather than the normal cast of The King of Fighters characters.

 
Released on November 1st, 2006.
This game is marketed as a dating game for girls, rather than the normal male perspective.
Features - Kyo Kusanagi, Iori Yagami, K', Ash Crimson, Terry Bogard, Rock Howard, Alba Meira, Ryo Sakazaki.

 
Released on April 3rd, 2007.
This game focuses on characters at work in various jobs, related to their normal game appearances.
Features - Kisarah Westfield, King, Kasumi Todoh, Mai Shiranui, Ai, Athena Asamiya.
Male characters - Geese Howard, Wolfgang Krauser, Konoe Hideki (original)
Exclusive character - Karen Ōkain.
All characters except Ai and Karen appeared first in the original two games.

 Days of Memories
Released on June 14th, 2007.
Compilation of the first three Days of Memories games for the Nintendo DS.

 
Released on June 19th, 2007.
The character roster is taken from The King of Fighters XI and KOF: Maximum Impact 2
Features - Ninon Beart, Elisabeth Blanctorche, Luise Meyrink, Momoko, Malin, Vanessa, Kaoru Watabe (Athena Asamiya's fan and friend), Alice Garnet Nakata (from the Fatal Fury slot machine, Alice would later appear in The King of Fighters XIV).
Side characters - Mignon Beart
Male characters - Magaki, Shion
Exclusive characters - Ayame Ichitsuka, Tsugumi Ichitsuka.

 Days of Memories 2
Released on April 24th, 2008.
Compilation of the fourth to sixth Days of Memories games for the Nintendo DS.

 
Released on May 5th, 2008.
This game focuses on characters at work in various jobs, related to their normal game appearances. This is the first game in the series to include characters from The Last Blade series.
Features - Athena Asamiya, Leona Heidern, Kula Diamond, Angel, Whip 
Side characters - Rimururu, Tsunami (from the exclusive Iroha game)
Male characters - Kyo Kusanagi, K', Ash Crimson, Haohmaru, Genjuro Kibagami, Setsuna, Kojiroh Sanada
Exclusive character - Kamisaki Misato

See also
 The King of Fighters series
 KOF: Maximum Impact 2
 Samurai Shodown series

References

External links
Days of Memories for DS official website  
Days of Memories official webpage 

2005 video games
Dating sims
Japan-exclusive video games
Mobile games
SNK franchises
SNK Playmore games
Video game franchises
Video games developed in Japan